Michael Grepp (born July 31, 1985 ) is an American actor, voice over artist, and musician.

Raised in Solon, Ohio he attended Solon High School from 2000–2004.  During this period he played in several local pop/rock bands, competing in various battle of the bands and High School Rock Offs in the greater Cleveland area. Upon graduating from Solon High School he went on to study Architecture at Miami University in Oxford, Ohio, eventually pursuing music alongside musical Kate Voegele, Powerspace, and Look Afraid. In September 2008 he became singer and rhythm guitarist for the Cincinnati/Dayton based band Just Above Jealous, staying with the band up until the groups mutual decision to go in separate directions in early February 2009. During his time with Just Above Jealous he began to write and record demos for several of the songs which would eventually make up The Hampshire EP, before finally returning to Miami University to graduate with a degree in Philosophy.

In late February 2010 The Hampshire EP was announced with an expected release date to be towards the end of summer, with its namesake derived from a side street off of Coventry Road. The Hampshire EP is expected to feature several guest musicians from the Cleveland area, with a less conventional approach to the typical acoustic release, with a focus on the creation of moods and layering of vocal melodies in an unconventional manner for the previously stated genre of music.

Discography

Ep's and Single's
"The Hampshire EP" (2010)
"An Allusion From" (2007)

References

External links
 Michael Grepp's Official Site

Living people
American male singer-songwriters
Musicians from Cleveland
1985 births
Singer-songwriters from Ohio